Nicolas Zaire (born 7 December 1986 in Martinique) is a professional footballer who plays as a defender for Club Franciscain in the Martinique Championnat National and internationally for Martinique.

He made his debut for Martinique in 2010. He was in the Martinique Gold Cup squads for the 2013 and 2017  tournaments.

References

1986 births
Living people
Martiniquais footballers
Martinique international footballers
Association football defenders
2017 CONCACAF Gold Cup players
2013 CONCACAF Gold Cup players